Caladenia gardneri, commonly known as the cherry spider orchid, is a species of orchid endemic to the south-west of Western Australia. It has a single, hairy leaf and up to three pale pink, sweetly scented flowers with a dark pinkish-red labellum.

Description
The flowers are sweetly scented and white, flushed with pink while the lateral sepals have narrow, club-like, glandular tips. The lateral sepals and petals spread widely and have their ends curving downwards. Flowering occurs from September to early November.

Taxonomy and naming
Caladenia gardneri was first described in 2001 by Stephen Hopper and Andrew Phillip Brown from a specimen collected near Pemberton and the description was published in Nuytsia. The specific epithet (gardneri) honours George Gardner, an amateur naturalist.

Distribution and habitat
Cherry spider orchid occurs between Yallingup and William Bay in the Jarrah Forest and Warren biogeographic regions where it grows in coastal woodland and heath.

Conservation
Caladenia gardneri  is classified as "not threatened" by the Government of Western Australia Department of Parks and Wildlife.

References

gardneri
Orchids of Western Australia
Endemic orchids of Australia
Plants described in 2001
Endemic flora of Western Australia
Taxa named by Stephen Hopper
Taxa named by Andrew Phillip Brown